Karl Steiner (born 12 January 1906, date of death unknown) was an Austrian diver. He competed in the men's 3 metre springboard event at the 1936 Summer Olympics.

References

1906 births
Year of death missing
Austrian male divers
Olympic divers of Austria
Divers at the 1936 Summer Olympics
Place of birth missing